South America Glacier is a small glacier near the southwest corner of the Kukri Hills in Victoria Land. The ice hangs down a cliff 2,000 m high, and takes a form similar to the continent for which it is named. Named by the Western Journey Party, led by Taylor, of the British Antarctic Expedition, 1910–13.

Glaciers of Victoria Land
McMurdo Dry Valleys